Alfred Moses may refer to:

Alfred H. Moses (born 1929), former US Ambassador to Romania
Alfred Moses (politician) (born 1977), Northwest Territories MLA, 2011–19
Alfred Huger Moses (1840–1918), American banker and investor who founded Sheffield, Alabama
Alfred Geiger Moses (1878-1956), rabbi in Alabama and founder of Jewish Science

See also
Moses (surname)